Gombe State University (GSU) is located in Tudun Wada, an area in Shamaki Ward, Gombe State, Nigeria. It is a member of the Association of Commonwealth Universities. The state university has a Chancellor and 11-members of the governing council, as well as principal officers and management staff. Abdullahi Mahadi was the first vice chancellor of the university.

Historical background 
Gombe State University was set up by Governor Muhammed Danjuma Goje in 2003. The state's ministry of education set up a 35-member committee of stakeholders who reported to the state executive council to establish a state owned university. The state executive council approved the constitution of a 24-member technical planning committee to oversee the affairs of the university at the time of its inception. The university produces graduates to enable them to engage in productive political, economic, and social activities. The university has no religious affiliation. As a state-owned university, it is affordable, with low tuition and accommodation costs.

Vice chancellors 
Abdullahi Mahdi was the first Chancellor of the university. Prior to joining Gombe State University as its pioneer vice chancellor when the university was established in 2004, Mahdi had served in the same capacity at Ahmadu Bello University, Zaria for a period of four years. He had been the Vice Chancellor of Gombe State University since its inception in 2005 until 2014, when the then governor of Gombe State, Ibrahim Dankwambo, appointed Ibrahim Umar as the next Vice Chancellor of the university. Before his appointment, Ibrahim Umar was the Dean, Faculty of Science and Postgraduate School of the university. He was born in 1958 in Nafada Local Government Area, Gombe State. The current vice chancellor is Aliyu Usman El-Nafaty as the 3rd Vice Chancellor of Gombe State University succeeding I.M Umar after the expiration of his tenure in 2019.

Faculties 

 Faculty of Arts and social science
 Faculty of Education
 Faculty of Science
 Faculty of Law
 Faculty of Pharmaceutical science

Postgraduate School 
School of Postgraduate was established following the section 7 (i) a of the Gombe State University Law 2004. While process for its establishment began in 2008/2009, first School of Postgraduate Board was inaugurated on 30th July, 2009.However, three (3) academic programs commenced from 2012/2013 academic session, namely: M.A History, M.Sc Physics and PGDE. Sequel to expansion in 2014/2015, the School of Postgraduate currently runs sixty-eight (68) programs under three (3) faculties.

College of Medical Sciences 
The college of medical science is made up of three faculties;

 Faculty of Medical Sciences
 Faculty of Basic Clinical Sciences 
 Faculty of Clinical Sciences

Library 
The University main library is a two-story building situated in the main campus with various offices, departments, units which houses the administrative, technical and other staffs. The Library has a large collection of books with over 52,000 volumes and 12,000 periodical titles, as well as a wide range of online and offline journals.

See also 

 Association of Commonwealth Universities
 Nigerian  Universities Commission

References

External links

Universities and colleges in Nigeria
2004 establishments in Nigeria
Educational institutions established in 2004
Schools in Gombe State